Saint Matthew is a 2.7-m high bronze statue of Saint Matthew by Lorenzo Ghiberti, completed in 1420 for the Arte del Cambio. One of a cycle of fourteen patron saints of the Florentine guilds commissioned for the external niches of Orsanmichele, it is now in the Museo di Orsanmichele.

Bibliography (in Italian)
Paola Grifoni, Francesca Nannelli, Le statue dei santi protettori delle arti fiorentine e ils Museo di Orsanmichele, Quaderni del servizio educativo, Edizioni Polistampa, Firenze 2006.
Giulia Brunetti, Ghiberti, Sansoni, Firenze 1966.

External links
 catalogo.uffizi.it
1423 sculptures
Matthew
Bronze sculptures